Benoît Barros (born 6 August 1989) is a French professional footballer who plays as a defensive midfielder for Championnat National 3 club Grandvillars. He previously played in the Czech Republic with Bohemians 1905, for which he appeared in the Synot Liga.

Notes

External links
 Benoît Barros at foot-national.com
 
 

1989 births
Living people
Sportspeople from Belfort
French footballers
Association football midfielders
ASM Belfort players
Bohemians 1905 players
FC Sellier & Bellot Vlašim players
Czech First League players
Championnat National players
Championnat National 2 players
Régional 1 players
Championnat National 3 players
French expatriate footballers
French expatriate sportspeople in the Czech Republic
Expatriate footballers in the Czech Republic
Footballers from Bourgogne-Franche-Comté